McCord House, also known as the McCord-Oxner House, is a historic home located at Columbia, South Carolina. It was built in 1849, and is a 1½-story clapboard Greek Revival style cottage, with additions made in the 1850s. It sits on a stuccoed raised basement. The front facade features a one-story portico supported by four stuccoed piers. It was built by David James McCord (1797–1855), a planter, lawyer, and editor, and his wife Louisa Susannah Cheves McCord, a noted author of political and economic essays, poetry, and drama. In 1865, the McCord House became the headquarters of General Oliver O. Howard, who was General William Tecumseh Sherman’s second in command. It was added to the National Register of Historic Places in 1979. The house is currently owned by Henry McMaster, the incumbent Governor of South Carolina, who purchased the property in May 2016.

References

Houses on the National Register of Historic Places in South Carolina
Greek Revival houses in South Carolina
Houses completed in 1849
Houses in Columbia, South Carolina
National Register of Historic Places in Columbia, South Carolina
1849 establishments in South Carolina